Alex Khaskin (born 1961) is a Russian-Canadian composer living and working in Toronto, Ontario, Canada.

Early life and education

He was born in St. Petersburg. He spent his early years studying music, classical orchestration, and arrangement.

Career
Khaskin immigrated to Canada in 1981 and later began working as a film composer while residing in Toronto. IN 2015 he wrote the score for the film A Christmas Horror Story by creating spooky adaptations of traditional Christmas carols.

Filmography

Fulltime Killer (2001)
Ginger Snaps Back (2004)
Chryzinium (2014)
A Christmas Horror Story (2015)
A change of Heart (Nature of Things - David Suzuki)
Evil Breed: The Legend of Samhain
Nostradamus (2000)
My Opposition: the Diaries of Friedrich Kellner (2007)
Ghost Trackers (YTV Canada) CCI Entertainment
Erky Perky (CCI and Ambience Entertainment.)
The Fifth Estate (CBC)
Driving Dreams (Barna Alper)
Haunter.

References

External links
 
 "Alex Khaskin". WorldCat Identities.

Date of birth missing (living people)
1961 births
Living people
Musicians from Saint Petersburg
Russian film score composers
Canadian film score composers
Male film score composers
Musicians from Toronto
Soviet emigrants to Canada